O.W.L. may refer to:
 Ordinary Wizarding Levels, a test of magical aptitude in the Harry Potter novel series
 Of Wondrous Legends,  an American psych folk band and their eponymous album